Absolute Radio 80s is a national digital radio station, owned and operated by Bauer as part of the Absolute Radio Network.

History
Absolute Radio 80s launched at 7.00pm on 4 December 2009, replacing Absolute Xtreme.

The marketing plan for Absolute 80s started with targeted sampling at 80s events such as Madness, Pet Shop Boys and Depeche Mode at the O2 Arena, Erasure at the NEC Birmingham and Simple Minds at the Wembley Arena. The first track to play on the station was "(You Gotta) Fight for Your Right (To Party!)" by the Beastie Boys.

On 14 May 2010, Absolute 80s began broadcasting in mono at 64kbps on Digital One national DAB digital radio.

On 29 February 2016, the station switched to the newly launched Sound Digital multiplex (an "upgrade" to 80kbps in mono) although it continued to broadcast on Digital One until the end of April 2016.

DJs
The station's DJs include Leona Graham, Sarah Champion and Richie Firth. Claire Sturgess hosts a live 80s show every Friday on sister station Absolute Radio that is also simulcast live on Absolute 80s called Friday Night 80s. The Dave Berry Breakfast Show is also simulcast live on Absolute 80s. Tony Hadley, the former lead singer of Spandau Ballet, used to host the two-hour 80s Party on Saturdays from 6pm, that ended in December 2019. Sarah Champion looks back on the chart hits of the decade on the 80s Chart Show on a Sunday from 4pm. Matthew Rudd hosts a Sunday night show, Forgotten 80s, featuring lesser-played hits of the decade from 9pm. From 23 September 2019, Absolute Radio's Hometime with Bush and Richie is simulcast on weekdays, with the same "split playlist" system as used at breakfast allowing relevant music to be played on each station.

References

External links

Absolute Radio
Radio stations established in 2009
2009 establishments in the United Kingdom
1980s-themed radio stations
Bauer Radio